Algeria competed at the 1972 Summer Olympics in Munich, West Germany.

Athletics

Key
Note–Ranks given for track events are within the athlete's heat only
Q = Qualified for the next round
q = Qualified for the next round as a fastest loser or, in field events, by position without achieving the qualifying target
NR = National record
N/A = Round not applicable for the event
Bye = Athlete not required to compete in round
NP = Not placed
Men
Track & road events

Boxing

References
Official Olympic Reports

Nations at the 1972 Summer Olympics
1972
Olympics